Andrea Augusta Gemma "Rea" Lenders (born 29 December 1980) is a trampoline gymnast from The Netherlands.

Andrea competed in the women's trampoline event at the 2004 Summer Olympics, after an 8th place in the qualification she also finished in 8th position in the final. At the 2012 Summer Olympics she finished 13th in the qualification and did not qualify for the final.

References

1980 births
Living people
Dutch female trampolinists
Gymnasts at the 2004 Summer Olympics
Gymnasts at the 2012 Summer Olympics
Olympic gymnasts of the Netherlands
Sportspeople from Groningen (city)
20th-century Dutch women
21st-century Dutch women